Sílvio Malvezi (alternate spelling: Malvesi, born 17 March 1960), or simply Sílvio, is a Brazilian former professional basketball player.

Career
During his pro club career, Malvezi won 3 Brazilian Championships, in the seasons 1980, 1981 (II), and 1983. With the senior Brazilian national basketball team, Malvezi competed at the 1984 Summer Olympics, and the 1986 FIBA World Cup.

References

External links
FIBA Profile 1
FIBA Profile 2

1960 births
Living people
Basketball players at the 1984 Summer Olympics
Brazilian men's basketball players
Centers (basketball)
Esporte Clube Sírio basketball players
Franca Basquetebol Clube players
Olympic basketball players of Brazil
Basketball players from São Paulo
1986 FIBA World Championship players